Christopher John Hughes (born 14 August 1947) is an English television personality and one of Britain's leading quizzers.

Biography
Hughes was born in Enfield, Middlesex, and educated at Enfield Grammar School. He worked as a train driver and railway worker. He has been a winner of Mastermind (1983), International Mastermind (1983) and Brain of Britain, 2005.  He is one of only seven people ever to have won both Mastermind and Brain of Britain, the others being Roger Pritchard, Kevin Ashman, Pat Gibson, Geoff Thomas, Ian Bayley, and Clive Dunning.

He also appeared on The Weakest Link on 24 September 2001, and was voted out in the final elimination round without answering a single question incorrectly during the whole show, having been named the strongest link in six of the seven elimination rounds. Host Anne Robinson declared Hughes to be "the best contestant we have had on the Weakest Link" and opted not to use her signature "you are the Weakest Link, goodbye!" catchphrase, instead simply saying "goodbye Chris". He appeared on the show again in March 2012 in The Weakest Link Quiz Show Champions Edition. He helped to bank a total of £7,750, including the maximum £1000 target (which was trebled) in round 8 playing alongside Stephanie Bruce. Hughes lost out in the head-to-head with 3 correct answers to Bruce's 4 out of 4.

He is currently a member of the regular panel of quiz experts on the UK television show, Eggheads.

As of 2010, he lives in Crewe, Cheshire.

Bibliography

References

External links

1947 births
Living people
Contestants on British game shows
People from Ponders End
People educated at Enfield Grammar School
People from Crewe